Band Master is a 1993 Indian Tamil-language romantic drama film, directed by K. S. Ravikumar. The film stars R. Sarathkumar and Heera, with Ranjitha, Vijayakumar and Srividya in supporting roles. It was released on 2 July 1993.

Plot 

Ravi, a bandmaster, leads a happy and self-contented life. Circumstances make him fall in love with Gita without realising that she is a minister's only daughter.

Cast 
R. Sarathkumar as Ravi
Heera as Gita
Ranjitha as Meenakshi
Vijayakumar as Veeraraghavan
Srividya
Goundamani as Mani
Senthil as Albert
Chinni Jayanth as the driver
Uday Prakash
 Pandu
 K. S. Ravikumar

Soundtrack 
Soundtrack was composed by Deva. Lyrics were written by Vaali and Kalidasan.

Release and reception 
Band Master was released on 2 July 1993. Malini Mannath of The Indian Express praised the performances of Sarathkumar, Heera and Chinni Jayanth.

Controversy 
In 2022, Lakshmi Priya, writing for The News Minute, criticised one scene where Ranjitha's character ill treats two dwarf characters by asking them to sniff food because "a sniff would be enough for their size" as insensitive, and a bad example of dwarfs being used for comic effect in Indian cinema.

References

External links 
 

1990s Tamil-language films
1993 films
1993 romantic drama films
Films about musical groups
Films directed by K. S. Ravikumar
Films scored by Deva (composer)
Films shot in Ooty
Indian romantic drama films